VDub was an American advertising campaign used by Volkswagen during 2006 for the Volkswagen GTI. Intended to parody MTV's Pimp My Ride, advertising agency Crispin Porter + Bogusky created a series of three television commercials directed by Jonas Åkerlund, starring Swedish actor Peter Stormare as an effete German engineer named Wolfgang, and German model Sonja Wöstendiek as his assistant Miss Helga. In each ad, Wolfgang introduces a "contestant" and Miss Helga showcases and insults their gaudy and distastefully modified compact car of a competitive make - specifically a Mitsubishi Eclipse, Ford Focus and a Honda Civic. Wolfgang then excitedly announces that they are going to "unpimp" the contestant's car, in which he presses a button on a handheld remote and the car is violently destroyed (the Eclipse is thrown by a trebuchet, the Focus is crushed by a shipping container, and the Civic is smashed by a wrecking ball) as the contestant watches. Each contestant is then given a brand new Volkswagen GTI, a car that has been "pre-tuned by German engineers". Wolfgang uses gestures and expressions reminiscent of hip-hop culture throughout the ads for humorous effect, such as when he proclaims "we just dropped it like it's hot!" after crushing a Ford Focus. Most notably, he opens every ad with "V Dub in the house!" and ends every ad by recreating the Volkswagen logo in a hand sign accompanied with, "V Dub! Representing Deutschland!" 

The commercials began airing in late February 2006.  Prior to the full launch of the TV campaign, the three 30-second spots became an early example of a viral video when popular automotive news website Leftlane News uploaded the ads to video distribution service YouTube. The ads became an early example of an Internet meme, as other YouTube users created their own parodies of the ads. By early March 2006, the ads had received over two million views on YouTube. Three years later, that number was over 10 million.

The ad campaign extended beyond the TV commercials. In one of the first examples of a company using social media to reach prospective customers, Volkswagen created a MySpace page for Miss Helga in which the character interacted with users. The advertised website, volkswagenfeatures.com, featured interactive videos of Miss Helga showcasing the car. The configurator on Volkswagen's website also allowed users to "test drive" their GTI around a test track while Miss Helga showcased the car's features from the passenger seat.

See also
Volkswagen advertising
Changes
Think Small
Fahrvergnügen

External links
 Compilation of all three advertisements
 Leftlane News
 VW GTI homepage

Volkswagen advertising
Fictional engineers
American television commercials
2000s television commercials
Advertising campaigns
Automobile advertising characters
Internet memes
Volkswagen Group